United Airlines Holdings, Inc. (formerly known as United Continental Holdings, Inc., UAL Corporation, Allegis Corporation and founded originally as UAL, Inc.) is a publicly traded airline holding company headquartered in the Willis Tower in Chicago. UAH owns and operates United Airlines, Inc. 

UAL Corporation agreed to change its name to United Continental Holdings in May 2010, when an agreement was reached between United and Continental Airlines where United would acquire Continental. To effect the acquisition, Continental shareholders received 1.05 shares of UAL stock for each Continental share; at the time of closing, it was estimated that United shareholders owned 55% of the merged entity and Continental shareholders owned 45%. The company or its subsidiary airlines also have several other subsidiaries. Once completely combined, United became the world's largest airline, as measured by revenue passenger miles. United is a founding member of the Star Alliance.

UAH has major operations at Chicago–O'Hare, Denver, Guam, Houston–Intercontinental, Los Angeles, Newark (New Jersey), San Francisco, and Washington–Dulles. Additionally, UAH's United is the largest U.S. carrier to the People's Republic of China and maintains a large operation throughout Asia.

UAH uses Continental's operating certificate and United's repair station certificate, having been approved by the FAA on November 30, 2011.

On June 27, 2019, the name of the parent company was changed from United Continental Holdings to United Airlines Holdings.

Major subsidiaries

The following is the list of major subsidiaries of United Airlines Holdings, Inc.

United Airlines, Inc. (formerly Continental Airlines, Inc.)
Air Micronesia, Inc.
Continental Micronesia, Inc.
CAL Cargo, S.A. de C.V.
CALFINCO Inc.
Century Casualty Company
Continental Airlines de Mexico, S.A.
Continental Airlines Domain Name Limited
Continental Airlines Finance Trust II
Continental Airlines, Inc. Supplemental Retirement Plan for Pilots Trust Agreement
Continental Airlines Purchasing Holdings LLC
Continental Airlines Purchasing Services LLC
Continental Express, Inc.
Presidents Club of Guam, Inc.
Four Star Insurance Company, Ltd.
UAL Benefits Management, Inc.
United Airlines, Inc. (the original United Airlines)
Covia LLC
Mileage Plus Holdings, LLC
MPH I, Inc.
Mileage Plus Marketing, Inc.
Mileage Plus, Inc.
United Aviation Fuels Corporation
United Cogen, Inc.
United Vacations, Inc.

Development
Early in February 2008, UAL Corporation and Continental Airlines began advanced stages of merger negotiations and were expected to announce their decision in the immediate aftermath of a definitive merger agreement between rival Delta Air Lines and Northwest Airlines. The timing of the events was notable because Northwest's golden shares in Continental (that gave Northwest veto authority against any merger involving Continental) could be redeemed, freeing Continental to pursue a marriage with United. On April 27, 2008, Continental broke off merger negotiations with United and stated it was going to stand alone. Despite ending merger talks, Continental announced that it would join United in the Star Alliance.

United and US Airways were in advanced merger talks in late April 2008, following the announcement that Continental had broken off talks with United. In June 2008, CEOs of both United Airlines and Continental Airlines signed an alliance pact presaging their eventual merger. The alliance is an agreement to link international networks and share technology and passenger perks. This agreement is basically a "virtual merger" that includes many of the benefits of a merger without the actual costs and restructuring involved. The alliance took effect about a year after Delta Air Lines and Northwest Airlines completed their merger, as that released Continental from the SkyTeam contract and allowed for the required nine-month notice. Additionally, Continental joined Star Alliance, as Delta and Northwest merged.

United Airlines was reported to be in serious merger discussion with US Airways in early April 2010. A New York Times report indicated that a deal was close. Union consent was cited as a major hurdle for negotiators to clear. On April 22, 2010, United announced that it would not pursue a merger with US Airways.

The Board of Directors at Continental and United Airlines approved a stock-swap deal that would combine them into the world's largest airline on Sunday, May 2, 2010. The airlines publicly announced the deal the next day. This would re-unite Walter Varney's airlines, which offspring includes Continental and United.

Both airlines have taken losses in the recession and expect the merger to generate savings of more than  a year. Combined, they fly to some 370 destinations in 59 countries from their ten hubs, and carry  passengers a year.

In July, the merger of the two airlines was approved by the European Union.

On August 27, 2010, the U.S. Department of Justice approved the $3 billion merger and shareholders of both the companies approved the merger on September 17, 2010. On October 1, 2010, UAL Corporation (the parent company of United Airlines) completed its acquisition of Continental Airlines and changed its name to United Continental Holdings, Inc. Although the two airlines remained separated until the operational integration was completed, as of this day both airlines are corporately controlled by the same leadership. Both carriers achieved a single operating certificate from the FAA on November 30, 2011 which allowed both airlines to operate under the name "United".

Finances 
For the fiscal year 2017, United Continental Holdings reported earnings of US$2.131 billion, with an annual revenue of US$37.736 billion, an increase of 3.2% over the previous fiscal cycle. United Continental's shares traded at over $69 per share, and its market capitalization was valued at over US$23.1 billion in October 2018. The company ranked No. 81 in the 2018 Fortune 500 list of the largest United States corporations by total revenue.

Branding
When United Airlines and Continental Airlines announced their merger in May 2010 they introduced their new corporate branding. It featured the words "United Airlines" in the then-current Continental typeface, and Continental's globe-like logo. United updated their branding once again in August 2010, replacing the words "United Airlines" with the single word UNITED and changing the font to United's traditional upper-case sans-serif font. United's new CEO Jeff Smisek, who previously served as Continental's chairman, helped design the new font, integrating it with the existing Lippincott-designed Continental graphics. He has noted that he has received over 15,000 emails with suggestions for a new livery.

The first United 747 featuring the new livery was painted in February 2011. Re-painting and branding is said to be "accelerated" beginning mid-2011.

On March 1, 2011, United unveiled an "interim" marketing campaign replacing the previous "It's Time to Fly" campaign, which included fingerpaint ads and television spots created by Fallon. On the same date, United removed the iconic 38-year-old Saul Bass-designed "Tulip" logo from its website and all new advertisements will feature the former Continental globe logo. This new campaign was used until 2012, when United reconditioned a former slogan, "Fly the Friendly Skies".

Fleet

As of April 22, 2021, United Airlines operated 835 mainline aircraft and 522 regional aircraft.

Hubs

United Airlines and United Express operated more than 4,500 flights a day to 339 destinations; 140 million customers were carried on 1.5 million flights in 2015.

See also

 Continental Airlines
 United Airlines
 List of airline mergers and acquisitions

References

External links
 

Companies in the Dow Jones Transportation Average
Companies listed on the Nasdaq
Airline holding companies of the United States
American companies established in 2010
Companies based in Chicago
United Airlines
Holding companies established in 2010
2010 establishments in Illinois